Grant Elementary School District (also known as Grant Elementary School) is its own independent public school district combined as a school, in Redding, California. It is the smallest school district in Redding, located in the far westside.

The district serves about 600 pupils in grades K to 8.

References

External links 
 

Redding, California
School districts in Shasta County, California